The Gran Premio Internacional Carlos Pellegrini is the most prestigious horse race in Argentina. It is run in December at the Hipódromo de San Isidro, near Buenos Aires. The race was tied for the 93rd highest rated Group/Grade 1 Race for three-year-olds and upwards in the 2020 Longines World Rankings, with a rating of 115.75.

The Gran Premio Internacional Carlos Pellegrini is the fourth race in the Argentinian Quadruple Crown, and is part of the Breeders' Cup Challenge Series, with the winner gaining an automatic berth in the Breeders' Cup Turf.

History 

The Gran Premio Internacional Carlos Pellegrini was first run in 1887, under the name of the Gran Premio Internacional. It was renamed the Gran Premio Carlos Pellegrini in 1941, with the name then changing between the two until 1979, when it was run as the Gran Premio República Argentina. Since 1980, the race has been run as the Gran Premio Carlos Pellegrini or Gran Premio Carlos Pellegrini Internacional. The location has also varied over time, being first run at the Hipódromo Nacional from 1887 to 1895, and then the Hipódromo Argentino from 1896 to 1940 and 1971 to 1978, and the Hipódromo de San Isidro from 1941 to 1970 and from 1979 to today.

The only year the race was not run was in 1976, although the 1985 edition was run in February 1986 due to an equine influenza epidemic.

There has twice been a dead heat: in 1915 between Dijital and Ocurrencia and in 1923 between Don Padilla and Movedizo.

In the 1952 edition, contested by Branding, Sideral, and Yatasto, was attended by 102,600 spectators, over the stated capacity of 100,000.

Due to the COVID-19 pandemic, the 2020 edition was run without foreign horses and almost entirely without spectator attendance.

Records
Speed Record:

 2:21.98 – Asidero (1999)

Most wins:
2 – Athos II (1890, 1892)
2 – Pitillo (1897, 1899)
2 – Old Man (1904, 1905)
2 – Mouchette (1911, 1912)
2 – Macon (1925, 1926)
2 – Romántico (1938, 1939)
2 – Filón (1944, 1945)
2 – Académico (1946, 1948)
2 – Storm Mayor (2005, 2006)

Most wins by a jockey:
 10 – Irineo Leguisamo (1924, 1930, 1932, 1934, 1944, 1945, 1948, 1954, 1961, 1962)
 4 – Pablo Falero (1991, 1992, 2000, 2005)
 4 – Edwin Rafael Talaverano Cardenas (1993, 1996, 1999, 2009)

Most wins by a trainer:
6 – Juan Lapistoy (1944, 1945, 1947, 1963, 1966, 1967)
6 – Alfredo Gaitán Dassié (1988, 1995, 2009, 2020, 2014, 2016)
5 – Sergio Lema (1962, 1968, 1969, 1971, 1972)
3 – Juan R. de la Cruz (1952, 1959, 1961)
3 – Carlos D. Etchechoury (2005, 2008, 2022)

Most wins by an owner:
4 – Haras El Turf (1969, 1923, 1968, 1971)
3 – J.B. Zubiaurre (1893, 1896, 1898)
3 – Indecís (1915, 1918, 1920)
3 – La Guardia (1911, 1912, 1929)
Most wins by a breeder:

 3 – Haras Orilla del Monte (2001, 2004, 2008)

Winners

 Unless indicated, all winners are Argentine.

References

External links

 Official Website
 Gran Premio Carlos Pellegrini Winners
 Winners of all the years

Horse races in Argentina